Municipal elections were held in Toronto, Ontario, Canada, on December 3, 1956. Incumbent mayor Nathan Phillips was easily reelected. Jean Newman became the first woman elected to the Board of Control, and topped the poll to become budget chief.

Toronto mayor
Nathan Phillips, elected two years earlier, faced only limited opposition from Trotskyist Ross Dowson and was easily reelected.

Results
Nathan Phillips - 80,352
Ross Dowson - 9,834

Board of Control
All four sitting Board of Control members chose to run for re-election. Controller and former mayor Leslie Saunders was pushed off the board by Jean Newman's victory.  Newman is the first woman to be elected to the Board of Control or to win a city-wide election in Toronto. The most senior two Controllers in terms of votes also sat on Metro Toronto Council.

Results
Jean Newman - 54,785
Ford Brand (incumbent) - 54,178
William Allen (incumbent) - 54,038
Joseph Cornish (incumbent) - 49,385
Leslie Saunders (incumbent) - 47,048
Harry Bradley - 16,450
Charles Sims - 6961
George Rolland - 5,632

City council
Two aldermen were elected per Ward. The alderman with the most votes was declared Senior Alderman and sat on both Toronto City Council and Metro Council. 

Ward 1 (Riverdale)
Ken Waters (incumbent) - 6,318
Fred Beavis - 3,636
Jean Brown - 3,412
George Phillips (incumbent) - 2,578
Dominic Di Stasi - 1,657
Basil Ingleby - 494

Ward 2 (Regent Park and Rosedale)
William Dennison (incumbent) - 4,962
May Birchard - 2,614
Sterling Campbell - 2,567
Edgar Roxborough (incumbent) - 2,380
Andrew Kavanaugh - 569
Philip Rowley - 528

Ward 3 (West Downtown and Summerhill)
Ross Parry (incumbent) - 4,149
John MacVicar - 1,980
Richard James - 2,537

Ward 4 (The Annex, Kensington Market and Garment District)
Herbert Orliffe (incumbent) - 4,437
Francis Chambers (incumbent) - 3,449
David Rotenberg - 2,692
Dorothy Cureatz - 628

Ward 5 (Trinity-Bellwoods and Little Italy)
Philip Givens (incumbent) - 6,226
Harold Menzies (incumbent) - 5,177
Ben Nobleman - 1,500
Paul Pauk - 1,092

Ward 6 (Davenport and Parkdale)
May Robinson (incumbent) - 8,691
Frank Clifton (incumbent) - 7,171
William Stevens - 3,884
Wallace Martin - 2,066
John Shedden - 1,795
George Jackson - 1,498

Ward 7 (Bloor West Village)
William Davidson (incumbent) - 5,122
John Kucherepa (incumbent) - 5,069
Thomas Wilson - 1,548
Stewart - 1,077
William Repka - 579

Ward 8 (The Beaches)
Donald Summerville (incumbent) - 12,567
Albert G. Cranham (incumbent) - 9,577
Chris Stavro - 2,488
John Square - 1,146

Ward 9 (North Toronto)
Frank Nash (incumbent) - 12,084
Kenneth Ostrander - 10,515
Alex Thompson - 8,064

Results are taken from the December 4, 1956 Toronto Star and might not exactly match final tallies.

Changes

Ward 7 Alderman John Kucherepa resigned January 6, 1958 having been elected in the 1957 Federal Election; Thomas Wilson was appointed replacement on January 20.

Suburbs

East York
Reeve
Jack Raymond Allen - 5,757
C. Howard Chandler - 4,510

Jack R. Allen defeated business executive C. Howard Chandler.
Source:

Etobicoke
Reeve
H.O. Waffle - 9,519
Jack Bennett - 5,014

Deputy Reeve Waffle defeated Bennett, a former Toronto alderman to replace retiring reeve Bev Lewis.

Deputy Reeve
Murray Johnston - 8,005
Charles Devlin - 6,429

Source:

Forest Hill
Reeve
Laurie T. Simonsky (acclaimed)

Source:

Leaside
Mayor
(incumbent)Charles Hiscott (acclaimed)

Source:

Long Branch
Reeve
(incumbent)Marie Curtis - 1,522
William Cambera - 553
Sherman Anderson - 175

Deputy Reeve
Maurice Breen - 1,309
Stanley Purvis - 888

Source:

Mimico
Mayor
(incumbent)William Arthur (Gus) Edwards - 1,802
Owen Gertrude - 1,098

Source:

New Toronto
Mayor
(incumbent)Donald Russell - 1,783
David Post - 810

Source:

North York
Reeve
Vernon Singer - 24,045
Maurice T. Hook - 5,302

Councillor Singer defeated former deputy reeve Hook to replace retiring reeve, Fred McMahon.
Source:

Scarborough
Reeve
Albert Campbell - 13,470
(incumbent)Gus Harris - 11,569

Deputy Reeve
George R. Mason - 13,270
John Algar - 11,361

Source:

Swansea
Reeve
(incumbent)Dorothy Hague (acclaimed)

Deputy Reeve
H.B. Squarebriggs - 1,233
K.C. Woodsworth - 740

Source:

Weston
Mayor
(incumbent)Harry Clark (acclaimed)

Source:

York
Reeve
Chris Tonks - 8,742
Walter Saunders - 7,736
Charles McMaster - 1,993

Source:

References
Election Coverage. Toronto Star. December 4, 1956

Toronto
1956
1956 in Ontario
December 1956 events in Canada